Kornelia Fiedkiewicz (born 5 August 2001) is a Polish freestyle swimmer. She competed in the mixed 4 × 100 metre medley relay at the 2020 Summer Olympics.

References

External links
 

2001 births
Living people
Polish female freestyle swimmers
Olympic swimmers of Poland
Swimmers at the 2020 Summer Olympics
People from Legnica
Swimmers at the 2018 Summer Youth Olympics
21st-century Polish women
Competitors at the 2022 World Games
World Games gold medalists